David Ross Brillinger (born 1937)  is a statistician and Emeritus Professor of Statistics at the University of California, Berkeley. He received his PhD from Princeton in 1961 under John Tukey. Brillinger's former doctoral students include Peter Guttorp, Ross Ihaka, Rafael Irizarry and Victor Panaretos.

References

Living people
Fellows of the Royal Society of Canada
1937 births
University of Toronto alumni
Princeton University alumni
University of California, Berkeley faculty
Mathematical statisticians